Mi Historia en La Academia (My Story in The Academy) is the first release from Mexican singer Myriam. It is a compilation album released in December 2002 after winning the first season of the Mexican reality talent show La Academia.

Album information
The album contains the songs that Myriam performed during La Academia. All of the songs had previously been released on the show-related albums that contained the songs by all contestants for each concert.

The album does not contain the songs that Myriam performed as a duet: "Believe" with Wendolee; "Suavemente" with Nadia; and "A Dios le Pido" with Victor. It also does not contain five of the six songs performed during the 3 final shows where she was already one of the finalists: "Te Quedo Grande la Yegua" and "Donde Estan" for the first semi-final; "Sombras" and "No Huyas de Mi" for the second semi-final; and "The Rose" on the final show.

The album was recorded in the small studio inside the house used for the show. Each song was recorded as part of the routine that all the contestants followed each week to perform their designated songs on the concert performed each Sunday.

Track listing

Certifications
Mi Historia en La Academia has been certified Platinum+Gold.

References

2002 compilation albums
Myriam Montemayor Cruz compilation albums